"I'm Outta Time" is a song by English rock band Oasis, featured on their seventh studio album, Dig Out Your Soul (2008). The second single from the album, succeeding "The Shock of the Lightning", "I'm Outta Time" was written by lead vocalist Liam Gallagher and released on 1 December 2008.

Composition
The song features a short speech sample from John Lennon taken from one of his last interviews in 1980. The speech sample says: "As Churchill said, it's every Englishman's inalienable right to live where the hell he likes. What's it going to do, vanish? Is it not going to be there when I get back?".

Reception
The song has been noted as one of the highlights of the album by fans, as well as the band themselves, with guitarist Noel Gallagher labelling it "deceptively brilliant". It has also been praised by music critics, with NME calling it a return to form, and comparing it to the music of Oasis-admired rock band The Beatles.

It charted at number 12 in the UK Singles Chart – the first Oasis single to miss the top ten since 1994, ending the band's streak of 22 consecutive top tens (not counting "Wibbling Rivalry", which peaked at number 52 between the releases of "Wonderwall" and "Don't Look Back in Anger"). It spent only two weeks in the UK top 75, the least ever by any Oasis single. Although only peaking at number 48 in France, the song spent a total of 28 weeks in the French Singles Chart, the most ever by any Oasis single.

Music video
The music video for "I'm Outta Time" was released in November 2008. Filmed in black and white, it shows Liam Gallagher, the only band member to appear in the clip, on a "surreal journey through a moon-lit English landscape". Directed by W.I.Z., it was filmed around Bourton-on-the-Water. At the end of the video, Liam is filmed in a close-up profile shot lying down. This bears resemblance to the back cover artwork for John Lennon's album Imagine. It also resembles the cover of Lennon's 1973 album Mind Games.

Covers
The song was covered by singer Lily Allen on BBC's Live Lounge on 2 December 2009.

Personnel
Liam Gallagher – vocals, acoustic guitar
Noel Gallagher – electric and acoustic guitars, electronics, mellotron, keyboards
Gem Archer – electric and acoustic guitars, piano, keyboards
Andy Bell – bass
Zak Starkey – drums
John Lennon – speech sample

Track listing

Charts

References

2008 singles
Oasis (band) songs
Songs about John Lennon
Songs written by Liam Gallagher
Song recordings produced by Dave Sardy
2008 songs
Rock ballads
Number-one singles in Scotland
UK Independent Singles Chart number-one singles
Black-and-white music videos